Rao Bhatti  is credited with establishing the modern town of Bathinda, Indian Punjab in the Lakhi jungle area in the 3rd century. The city Bhatinda was captured by him from Brars.

References 

Indian urban planners
Year of birth unknown
Year of death unknown
3rd-century Indian architects
People from Bathinda district
Male artists from Punjab, India